Fuchs (German and Yiddish for "fox") is a surname; it has as variants Fux, Fuhs and Fuchß. Notable persons bearing it include the following:

Notable people

Fuchs, A  - D 
 Arved Fuchs (born 1953), German writer and adventurer
 Benjamin Fuchs (born 1983), German-Austrian footballer
  Bernard Fuchs (1916–2005), French pilot and hero of the Second World War
  Bernie Fuchs (1932–2009), American illustrator
  Bruce Fuchs, American immunologist and health science administrator
  Charlie Fuchs  (1912–1969), American baseball player
  Christian Fuchs (born 1986), Austrian footballer
  Christine Schwarz-Fuchs (born 1974), Austrian entrepreneur and politician
  Christoph Fuchs von Fuchsberg (1482–1542), bishop of Brixen
 Daniel Fuchs (1909–1993), American writer and screenwriter
 Dmitry Fuchs (born 1939), Russian-American mathematician
 Doris Fuchs (born 1966), German political scientist
 Doris G. Fuchs (born 1938), American gymnast

Fuchs, E -  F 
 Eduard Fuchs (1870–1940), Marxist cultural scientist
 Elaine Fuchs (born 1950), American cell biologist
 Emil Fuchs (1866–1929), Austrian-American sculptor
 Emil Fuchs (theologian) (1874–1971), German theologian
 Emil Fuchs (baseball) (1878–1961), owner of the Boston Braves 1923–1935 
 Erich Fuchs (1902–1980), German Nazi SS officer and Holocaust perpetrator
 Erika Fuchs (1906–2005), German translator of Disney comics
 
Franz Fuchs (1949–2000), Austrian terrorist
  Fred Fuchs (DOB unknown), American television producer

Fuchs,  G - I 
  Gottfried Fuchs (1889–1972), German-Canadian soccer player
  Harald Fuchs (born 1951), professor of physics
  Henry Fuchs (baseball) (1879–1947), also known as Jacob Fox, American baseball player
 Henry Fuchs, born Henryk Tauber (1917–2000), Holocaust survivor
  Henry Fuchs (born 1948), American academic
  Herbert Fuchs (1905–1988), American lawyer
  Ignaz Fuchs, (1819–1854), born Vatroslav Lisinski, Croatian composer 
 Ira Fuchs, co-founder of BITNET

Fuchs, J 
 Jenő Fuchs (1882–1955), Hungarian Olympic champion fencer
  Jim Fuchs (1927–2010), American athlete
 Joël Fuchs (born 1989), Swiss basketball player
 Johann Nepomuk von Fuchs (1774–1856), German chemist who gave his name to fuchsite
 Joseph Fuchs (1899–1997), American violinist
  Josef Fuchs (theologian) (1912–2005), German theologian
  Jürgen Fuchs (motorcyclist), German motorcyclist
 Jürgen Fuchs (writer) (1950–1999), East German writer and dissident
 Karl Fuchs (museum founder) (1776–1846), Russian doctor and rector of the Kazan State University
  Kenneth Fuchs (born 1956), American composer of classical music
 Klaus Fuchs (1911–1988), German-born British physicist and Soviet spy, later resident of the GDR

Fuchs, K - M 
 Lars Fuchs (born 1982), German footballer
 László Fuchs (born 1924), Hungarian-American mathematician
  Lawrence Fuchs (1927–2013), American university professor and author
  Lazarus Fuchs (1833–1902), German mathematician
 Leonhart Fuchs (sometimes Leonhard) (1501–1566), German physician and botanist
  Lillian Fuchs (1901–1995), American violist
 Lukas Fuchs (1922–2009), better known as Lukas Foss, German-American composer
 Marta Fuchs (1898–1974), German opera singer

Fuchs, N - Z 
 Nicolas Fuchs (born 1982), Peruvian rally driver
 Peter Paul Fuchs (1916–2007), Austrian-born conductor and composer
 Radovan Fuchs (born 1953), Croatian scientist and former government minister
 Richard Fuchs (1887–1947), architect and composer
 Robert Fuchs (1847–1927), Austrian composer
 Ronald Fuchs (1932–2012) American physicist
 Ruth Fuchs (born 1946), German athlete
 Thomas Fuchs (born 1969), German-born illustrator
 Vivian Fuchs (1908–1999), British geologist and polar explorer
 Walter Robert Fuchs (1937–1976), American-German science communicator and science popularizer
 Wilhelm Fuchs (1898–1947), German Nazi SS officer and Holocaust perpetrator executed for war crimes
 Wolfgang Heinrich Johannes Fuchs (1915–1997), mathematician

Fucks 
 Argélico Fucks (born 1974, Santa Rosa), Brazilian footballer
see also:
 Ralf Fücks (born 1951), German politician

Fuks 
 Ladislav Fuks (1923–1994), Czech novelist
 Marian Fuks (photographer) (1884–1935), Polish filmmaker and pioneer of photography
 Marian Fuks (historian) (1914–2022), Polish historian
 Alexander Fuks (1917–1978), German-born Israeli historian, archaeologist and papyrologist
 Suzon Fuks (born 1959), artist, choreographer and director
 Pavel Fuks (born 1971), Ukrainian-Russian millionaire businessman and investor

Fux 
Johann Joseph Fux (1660–1741), Austrian composer, music theorist and pedagogue
Vinzenz Fux (c. 1606–1659), Austrian composer
Herbert Fux (1927–2007), Austrian actor
Luiz Fux (born 1953), Brazilian judge

See also
Fox (surname)
Vos (surname)

German-language surnames
Germanic-language surnames
Jewish surnames
Yiddish-language surnames
Surnames from nicknames